Gunnar Dyrberg (12 November 1921 Faaborg – 8 January 2012) was a member of the Danish resistance movement during World War II, leading  the Holger Danske, a Danish resistance group in the capital Copenhagen, from 1943 to 1945. After the war, Dyrberg became a public administrator, holding several appointed positions in government, and later a public relations executive in banking. For more than 40 years, he also owned and operated a horse farm, breeding and training Icelandic horses in Høsterkøb, North Zealand.

From 1994 to 2000, Dyrberg published his own writing: his novels and memoirs were based on his experiences in the Resistance. He was featured in the 2003 Danish documentary film, With a Right to Kill (Med ret til at dræbe), based on the 2001 history by Peter Øvig Knudsen. The book and film were part of some of the first efforts by Danes to seriously study issues raised by the liquidation of 400 persons by the Danish Resistance during the war. The film featured news footage, interviews with surviving agents and leaders of the Resistance movement, and reconstruction of known events.

Dyrberg's Holger Danske group was also the subject of Flame and Citron (Flammen og Citronen, 2008), a Danish fictionalized dramatic film based on actions of its two most noted members, who were both killed by the Germans before the end of the war.

Nazi occupation and resistance

After the Nazis occupied Denmark, Dyrberg was among the many young men who joined the Danish Resistance. He used the code name, "Herman," to disguise his identity during the German occupation. He rose to lead the Holger Danske, a resistance group in Copenhagen.

Dyrberg had a very close working relationship with Bent Faurschou-Hviid ("Flame") and Jørgen Haagen Schmith (code named "Citron"), two of the most noted members of the group. After the war, Dyrberg admitted that he had directed the killing of several German informants and soldiers, though the number has never been publicly revealed. Before 1944, the group killed only Danish Nazis, informers, and collaborators, to reduce the threat of overwhelming Nazi retaliation against the civilian population.

In 1945, Dyrberg was appointed head of the Resistance Press Office. For decades after the war, issues related to the choices of Danish targets to be liquidated were not much discussed; politicians wanted to support the resistance in the postwar effort to rebuild their society.

Post-war years
In 1946 Dyrberg married Lulla. They had two sons together.

He went to college after the war, getting a degree in economics in 1948 at the University of Copenhagen. He worked for the government on programs to implement the Marshall Plan, serving in the Directorate for Product Supplies, a trade policy department (1948–52), and in the Department of Commerce, on its Productivity Committee (predecessor of Danish Trade) (1952-1953). He also worked with representatives of other governments and businesses to help improve the efficiency of industry, trade and commerce in Europe.

He later acted as a governmental consultant to the Greek and Italian productivity centers. He continued to represent businesses, for instance the Federation of Merchant Associations. He re-entered government when appointed as Secretary of Craft, and worked in several trade ministry areas.

From 1966 to 1986 Dyrberg worked at the Farmers' Bank (in 1976 renamed The Danish Bank).  He was appointed as head of public relations and information. (He was the first PR manager at Danish banking.) He also trained the first consultants in a Danish bank. He retired from business in 1987.

From 1971 until 2012, Dyrberg also owned and operated the Lille Søgård (Small Sogard), a farm for breeding and training Icelandic horses. It was located in Høsterkøb, North Zealand.

Communications and literature
He served as editor for several journals: one related to the Resistance, as well as professional magazines. This work included being editor of Holger Danske's Home Guard Association's magazine, 1946–48; the weekly magazine Building Trades, 1958–65; Danish Crafts 1960–62; Advice: The Danish Bank Staff Bulletin, 1966–85; Quarterly, Farmers' Bank's financial magazine, 1967–71; and Pondus Item, 1967–82; and the member magazine of the Danish Invest, 1987–1992.

Dyrberg began writing fiction and memoirs to explore and share his experiences during the war. Beginning in 1994, he published several books: both novels and memoirs about his time in the Danish resistance movement.

Representation in other media
Dyrberg was featured in the 2003 documentary film, With a Right to Kill (Med ret til at dræbe), about the Holger Danske group. The 2008 Danish dramatic film, Flame and Citron (Flammen og Citronen), featured two of his most prominent agents as the central characters, and portrayed the complex, morally ambiguous relations within the Resistance.

Gunnar Dyrberg died at his home in Hørsholm following a long illness on 8 January 2012, at the age of 90.

Books
1994, Explosion in May
1994, The Tomato Is Rotten
1995, Shot in the Avenue
1997, Debit Left - Credit to the Right
2000, When the Villagers Get Peasants

References

1921 births
2012 deaths
Danish resistance members
20th-century Danish memoirists
20th-century Danish non-fiction writers
Danish male novelists
20th-century Danish businesspeople
21st-century Danish businesspeople
Danish civil servants
People from Faaborg-Midtfyn Municipality
People from Hørsholm Municipality
20th-century Danish novelists
20th-century Danish male writers
Male non-fiction writers